Reinhard Münster (born 1 October 1941) is a Danish fencer. He competed in the individual and team épée events at the 1972 Summer Olympics.

References

1941 births
Living people
Danish male épée fencers
Olympic fencers of Denmark
Fencers at the 1972 Summer Olympics
People from Neustrelitz